Bartonella australis is a Gram-negative bacterium of the genus Bartonella which was isolated from eastern grey kangaroos (Macropus giganteus).

References

Further reading

External links
Type strain of Bartonella australis at BacDive -  the Bacterial Diversity Metadatabase
  

Bartonellaceae
Bacteria described in 2007